Lick Branch is a  long 1st order tributary to the Dan River in Halifax County, Virginia.

Course 
Lick Branch rises about 2.0 miles east-northeast of Omega, Virginia, and then flows north to join the Dan River about 3.5 miles northeast of Omega.

Watershed 
Lick Branch drains  of area, receives about 45.5 in/year of precipitation, has a wetness index of 410.97, and is about 53% forested.

See also 
 List of Virginia Rivers

References 

Rivers of Virginia
Rivers of Halifax County, Virginia
Tributaries of the Roanoke River